Rimmel may refer to:
 Rimmel,  British multinational cosmetics brand
 Rimmel (album), album by Italian singer-songwriter Francesco De Gregori

People with the name
 Aleksander Rimmel (1888–?), Estonian politician
 Eugène Rimmel (1820–1887), French-born British perfumer and businessman
 Kai Rimmel (born 1952), Estonian politician
 Rimmel Daniel (born 1991), Grenadian footballer